This is a list of specific PC titles. For a list of all PC titles, see List of PC games.

The following is a list of games released on the Linux operating system. Games do not have to be exclusive to Linux, but they do have to be natively playable on Linux to be listed here.

List
The following list has 27 segments in total, a numerical section followed by sections ranging from A to Z.

0–9

A

B

C

D

E

F

G

H

I

J

K

L

M

N

O

P

Q

R

S

T

U

V

W

X

Y

Z

See also

 List of PC games
 List of freeware
 Lists of video games
 List of Linux games on Steam
 Lists with Steam games that are confirmed to work on Linux and those with only hints of Linux support

References

Linux